Thomas Clinton Gascoigne (4 November 1899 – 1991) was an English professional footballer who played as a right half.

Career
Born in Scotswood, Gascoigne played for Scotswood, Leeds United, Doncaster Rovers, Bradford City, Tranmere Rovers and Hurst.

For Bradford City he made 21 appearances in the Football League.

Sources

References

1899 births
1991 deaths
English footballers
Leeds United F.C. players
Doncaster Rovers F.C. players
Bradford City A.F.C. players
Tranmere Rovers F.C. players
Ashton United F.C. players
English Football League players
Association football wing halves